Terrin Vavra (born May 12, 1997) is an American professional baseball infielder for the Baltimore Orioles of Major League Baseball (MLB). He made his MLB debut in 2022.

Amateur career
Vavra attended Menomonie High School in Menomonie, Wisconsin, where he played baseball and ice hockey. In 2015, his senior year, he earned All-State honors in baseball.

Undrafted in the 2015 Major League Baseball draft, Vavra enrolled at the University of Minnesota, where he played college baseball for the Minnesota Golden Gophers. In 2016, Vavra's freshman year at Minnesota, he appeared in 32 games (missing time due to a back injury), batting .358 with one home run and twenty RBIs. As a sophomore in 2017, he played in fifty games, hitting .308 with two home runs and 19 RBIs. That summer, he played in the Cape Cod Baseball League with the Cotuit Kettleers. In 2018, his junior season, Vavra was a unanimous All-Big Ten First Team selection alongside earning First Team All American honors; for the year, he started 58 games in which he slashed .386/.455/.614 with ten home runs and 59 RBIs.

Professional career
Following the season, the Colorado Rockies selected Vavra in the third round of the 2018 Major League Baseball draft. Vavra signed with Colorado and made his professional debut with the Boise Hawks of the Class A Short Season Northwest League (with whom he was named an All-Star), batting .302 with four home runs and 26 RBIs over 44 games. Vavra spent the 2019 season with the Asheville Tourists of the Class A South Atlantic League, earning All-Star honors. He was named the SAL Player of the Month for June after hitting .350. Over 102 games, he slashed .318/.409/.489 with ten home runs, 52 RBIs, and 18 stolen bases, earning the title of SAL Most Valuable Player. Vavra did not play a minor league game in 2020 due to the cancellation of the minor league season caused by the COVID-19 pandemic.

On August 30, 2020, the Rockies traded Vavra, Tyler Nevin and a player to be named later (later revealed to be Mishael Deson) to the Baltimore Orioles for Mychal Givens. For the 2021 season, he was assigned to the Bowie Baysox of the Double-A Northeast. He was on the injured list for nearly two months with a back injury. Over forty games with Bowie, Vavra batted .248 with five home runs and twenty RBIs.

On November 19, 2021, the Orioles selected Vavra's contract and added him to their 40-man roster. He began the 2022 season with the Norfolk Tides of the Triple-A International League. After 13 games, he was placed on the injured list with a hamstring strain. He returned to play in early June.

On July 26, 2022, the Orioles promoted Vavra to the major leagues. He made his MLB debut on July 29.

Personal life
Vavra's father, Joe Vavra, is a professional baseball coach. Vavra and his wife, Carlie, had their first child, a daughter, in August 2022.

References

External links

1997 births
Living people
Aberdeen IronBirds players
Asheville Tourists players
Baltimore Orioles players
Baseball players from Wisconsin
Boise Hawks players
Bowie Baysox players
Cotuit Kettleers players
Duluth Huskies players
Florida Complex League Orioles players
Major League Baseball infielders
Minnesota Golden Gophers baseball players
Norfolk Tides players
People from Menomonie, Wisconsin